Ralkuli Bridge is a road bridge in eastern Sri Lanka. The bridge was formally opened on 19 October 2011.

The bridge cost 571 million rupees (US$5.2 million) and was financed by a soft loan from the French Development Agency's Trincomalee Integrated Infrastructure Project and the Sri Lankan Government's Kilakku Vasantham (Eastern Awakening) programme. The bridge is part of the A15 Batticaloa-Trincomalee highway. The bridge replaced a ferry boat service that had been transporting people and vehicles across the river.

References 

2011 establishments in Sri Lanka
Bridges completed in 2011
Bridges in Trincomalee District